The faintsaddled snake eel (Ophichthus hyposagmatus) is an eel in the family Ophichthidae (worm/snake eels). It was described by John E. McCosker and Eugenia Brandt Böhlke in 1984. It is a marine, temperate water-dwelling eel which is known from the western central Atlantic Ocean. It is known to dwell at a depth of 108 meters.

References

Ophichthus
Taxa named by John E. McCosker
Taxa named by Eugenia Brandt Böhlke
Fish described in 1984